The Perth Gaol (often referred to as the Old Perth Gaol) was a gaol built in Perth, the state capital of Western Australia, between 1854 and 1856 to house convicts and other prisoners. It is located just west of Beaufort Street.

It operated until March 1888 when the last prisoner was transferred to Fremantle Prison.  The main gaol building, minus the yards, stands today adjacent to the Western Australian Museum in Perth.

History 
Prior to the construction of the Perth Gaol, the Swan River Colony had only the Round House in Fremantle, the partially completed Fremantle Prison (construction began in 1851 and completed in 1859) and a six-cell lock-up which had been built in about 1830 opposite Government House in Perth. With the growth of the city it was deemed that the latter was an inappropriate location for a gaol and it was demolished in 1855 (the site now occupied by The Deanery). A new site was selected by the Colonial Secretary, Charles Piesse and the Surveyor-General, John Septimus Roe and reserved on a rise on what is now near the intersection of Beaufort and Francis Streets.

With the expanding population and with the importation of convicts in 1850 to provide a labour force for public works, there was a need for a facility to house inmates near the city. A proposal was submitted to Governor Charles Fitzgerald in December 1853 for such a facility comprising two floors with a basement. The project was approved but construction took longer than expected and substantial modifications to the original design were made while work progressed.  The final building comprised a cruciform layout with cells, a chapel, gaolers' quarters and prisoners' yards.

The design was by architect Richard Roach Jewell, the city Chief of Works who had only recently arrived in the colony and who went on to also design a number of other public buildings in the city, including the Barracks Arch and the Perth Town Hall. The gaol was built using sub-contract labour with stone provided by convict labour.  The stone was cut from limestone cliffs in Rocky Bay near Fremantle and floated up the Swan River on barges. The first stage cost £2220/15/10 ($4443).

While construction was underway, the Enquirer newspaper appealed for provision of facilities for hangings at the gaol.

The first execution took place in 1855 in an execution yard on the south side of the site.  After complaints, the sides of the gallows were enclosed to hide the executions from public gaze.  The gallows remained until the gaol ceased operating in 1888.

Colonial prisoners were mainly housed in the gaol from its opening, but in 1858, control transferred to the Imperial Convict Establishment which managed the convicts, and the colonial prisoners were transferred to Fremantle Prison.  Transportation of convicts ended in 1868 and in 1875 the gaol was handed back to the colonial government.  In 1886 it was reported that the gaol was overcrowded with 128 prisoners and at times the inmate population had reached 150.  Later that year the Convict Establishment was disbanded, leading to the imminent demise of the gaol. The last prisoner was transferred to Fremantle in about 1888 and it ceased being used as a gaol from that date.

It was used briefly as the Perth courthouse before that returned to Stirling Gardens, and for a few years it had occasional use by the police and other government departments.

Executions

Perth Museum 

In 1891 the building was renamed to the Geological Museum and used to store Reverend Charles Nicolay's geological collection. In 1892 the building was renamed as the Perth Museum, storing the Swan River Mechanics' Institute museum collection as well as a collection of Aboriginal artifacts from the Police Department. At about the same time, the building was substantially modified with the roof lowered and the entire central cell block removed.  A northern wing was built in 1895.

Construction of the adjacent Jubilee Building commenced in 1897 and finished in 1899, which gave a new home to the museum, with the gaol continuing to be used until the present day as a museum annex for displays and storage.

From 1968 until about 1976, major renovations of the gaol were undertaken including raising the roof to its original height and alignment.  As few original plans were available, it was not attempted to return the building to its exact original configuration, however the exterior is now substantially restored. Fire doors were fitted with improved ground floor and first floor access for visitors.

The building is now a part of the Perth Cultural Centre, which includes the Western Australian Museum, the Art Gallery, the J S Battye Library and the State Library of Western Australia.

See also 
 Comptroller General of Convicts (Western Australia)

References

External links 

 
 

Convictism in Western Australia
Defunct prisons in Western Australia
Prison museums in Australia
Museums in Perth, Western Australia
State Register of Heritage Places in the City of Perth